Oregocerata recurrens is a species of moth of the family Tortricidae. It is found in Cotopaxi Province, Ecuador.

The wingspan is 21 mm. The ground colour of the forewings is creamish, tinged with brown and spotted with dark brown. The hindwings are cream, slightly mixed with ochreous apically.

Etymology
The species name refers to the strong curvature of the distal part of the aedeagus and is derived from Latin recurrens (meaning running back).

References

Moths described in 2008
Euliini